First seeds Pierre-Hugues Herbert and Nicolas Mahut won the title, beating Tobias Kamke and Philipp Marx in the final 6–3, 6–4.

Seeds

Draw

Draw

References
 Main Draw

Internationaux de Tennis de Vendee
Internationaux de Tennis de Vendée